"You Right" is a song by American rapper and singer Doja Cat and Canadian singer the Weeknd, from Doja Cat's third studio album, Planet Her. It was released through Kemosabe and RCA Records on June 24, 2021, as the second single of the album. The song officially impacted American contemporary hit radio and rhythmic contemporary radio on June 29. The track received acclaim from music critics. Commercially, the song reached the top 15 in eleven countries and reached number 12 on the Billboard Global 200 chart.

Background and recording
Doja Cat had expressed her desire for the Weeknd to feature on her third studio album, Planet Her, during the recording process, initially having showed him one song that she herself thought was "the perfect song." According to Doja Cat, that song "ended up not working," however after playing him the original solo version of "You Right," which was already complete with two verses, he became "obsessed" with it and they replaced one of those solo verses with his own. An extended version of the song featuring Doja Cat's original second verse appeared as the fifteenth track on the deluxe edition of Planet Her, which was released on June 26. 

The song's existence and its status as the "steamy second single" was announced on April 22, 2021, in a Billboard cover story interview with Doja Cat, in which the Weeknd had contributed the statement: "Doja is a star, and has created a unique universe you just want to lose yourself in. She's got such drive and vast creative vision that we will be seeing her impact for a very long time to come." During a red carpet interview at the 2021 Billboard Music Awards in late May, Doja Cat once again confirmed that "You Right" would be the second single from Planet Her following "Kiss Me More." The song marks the second collaboration between Doja Cat and the Weeknd, following the remix of the Weeknd's 2020 single "In Your Eyes."

Critical reception
Vulture, during its review of Planet Her, described "You Right" as a song that serves to channel the feelings of self-pity. Fred Thomas of AllMusic found the song to be "slick cosmic R&B." Writing for Entertainment Weekly, Leah Greenblatt called "You Right" a "slow-rolling infidelity anthem," featuring the "dark-lord 3 a.m. energy" of the Weeknd. In an NME article, Nick Levine called the song a "dreamy duet" between Doja Cat and the Weeknd, but noted the presence of Dr. Luke as a producer, who "became a music industry pariah in 2014 after being accused of emotional abuse and sexual assault by Kesha," calling it "telling" that he was now credited as "Dr. Luke" instead of the pseudonym "Tyson Trax" used on "Say So." Safy-Hallan Farah of Pitchfork wrote that the "longing and yearning" of Doja Cat's pre-chorus "segues effortlessly into a resigned hook."

Accolades

Music video

The music video was filmed in June 2021, directed by Quentin Deronzier. The music video for "You Right" was released alongside the album on June 25, 2021. Doja Cat appeared on an episode of YouTube Originals' Released series leading up to the release. In the music video, Doja Cat is in a Greek goddess-like kingdom amongst the clouds. She sings about her temptations to cheat on her boyfriend (played by model Chris Petersen) with the Weeknd, who tries to convince Doja Cat into having the affair.

The music video is heavily influenced by astrology, with Doja Cat and the Weeknd paying homage to their respective astrological signs. Doja Cat is a Libra, which is represented by the scales. In the beginning of the video, Doja Cat appears with her wig shaped as the zodiac's symbol, as she sings in the middle of a large balance scale. The Weeknd is an Aquarius, which is represented by the water bearer. When he appears in the video, he pours water from the zodiac's cup onto Doja Cat.

Credits and personnel

 Doja Cat – songwriting, vocals
 The Weeknd – songwriting, vocals
 Dr. Luke – songwriting, production
 John Hanes – engineering
 Rian Lewis – engineering
 Serban Ghenea – mixing
 Mike Bozzi – mastering

Charts

Weekly charts

Year-end charts

Certifications

Release history

References

External links
  
  

2021 singles
2021 songs
Doja Cat songs
Kemosabe Records singles
Song recordings produced by Dr. Luke
Songs about infidelity
Songs written by Dr. Luke
Songs written by Doja Cat
Songs written by the Weeknd
The Weeknd songs